Paracanthocobitis is a genus, or subgenus, of freshwater fish in the family Nemacheilidae. This genus is known from the Indus basin in Pakistan to the Mekong basin of Cambodia and Laos The type species is Paracanthocobitis zonalternans. Some authorities treat this as a subgenus of Acanthocobitis and Fishbase only includes the five species described in 2015 by Singer & Plant, meaning that P. (A). zonalternans is not the type species.

Species
SInger and Page recognised 14 species in this genus:
 Paracanthocobitis abutwebi R. A. Singer & Page, 2015 (Hillstream zipper loach) 
 Paracanthocobitis adelaideae R. A. Singer & Page, 2015 (Checkerboard zipper loach) 
 Paracanthocobitis aurea (F. Day, 1872) (Barred zipper loach) 
 Paracanthocobitis botia (F. Hamilton, 1822) (Mottled zipper loach)
 Paracanthocobitis canicula R. A. Singer & Page, 2015 (Houndstooth zipper loach) 
 Paracanthocobitis linypha R. A. Singer & Page, 2015 (Sewing needle zipper loach) 
 Paracanthocobitis mackenziei (B. L. Chaudhuri, 1910) (Robust zipper loach) 
 Paracanthocobitis maekhlongensis R. A. Singer & Page, 2015 (Maekhlong zipper loach) 
 Paracanthocobitis mandalayensis (Rendahl (de), 1948)  (Mandalay zipper loach) 
 Paracanthocobitis mooreh (Sykes, 1839) (Maharashtra zipper loach)
 Paracanthocobitis pictilis (Kottelat, 2012) (Ataran zipper loach) 
 Paracanthocobitis rubidipinnis (Blyth, 1860) (Cherryfin zipper loach)
 Paracanthocobitis urophthalma (Günther, 1868) (Banded mountain zipper loach)
 Paracanthocobitis zonalternans (Blyth, 1860) (Dwarf zipper loach)

Fishbase only recognises 5, i.e. P. abutwebi,  P. adelaidae, P. canicula, P. linypha and P. maekhlongensis.

References

Nemacheilidae
Fish of Asia
 
Animal subgenera